Eteobalea klisieckii is a moth in the family Cosmopterigidae. It is found in Morocco.

The wingspan is about 25 mm.

References

Moths described in 1966
Eteobalea
Endemic fauna of Morocco
Moths of Africa